Davide Squillace (born 6 December 1977) is a DJ and producer from Italy, and the founder of several record labels.

Early life
Born in Siena, Italy, his family moved back to its home town, Naples, just after his birth. In Naples he developed a genuine interest in electronic music, thanks to the famous local scene. After finishing school, in 1995, he went to London, where he lived for three years. In London he was fascinated by the British scene and he began buying the first music equipments to produce techno music and managed to have his first record published by Primate Records. Soon other labels got interested in his work and he published more EPs with Audio and Contrast. In 1999 he went back to Naples, where he began studying at the local school of sound engineering, graduating in two years. During these years he did not published lot of music, but he focused on studying and working in the neapolitan techno clubs where he became very famous alongside Marco Carola and Rino Cerrone.

Career
In 2004 Davide left Naples for Barcelona. In the following years he released Ep's for labels such as, Ovum, Sci+Tec, Morris Audio, Resopal Schallware, Supernature, CMYK, Adagio, Viva, Nervous, Saved, Shake, Rillis. 
These releases led to appearances at venues such as Circoloco, where he has been a resident since 2007, Coachella, Sónar, Womb, Berghain and many more.
He also created several labels, releasing his own music, but also from other artists: Sketch, Minisketch, Vir, 500, Titbit and Hideout. His side project, Better Lost Than Stupid sees Davide collaborate with fellow revered DJ’s: Martin Buttrich and Matthias Tanzmann.

Selected discography
 High Endurance E.P. (10", EP, Pur) Primate Recordings 1998 
 Organik (12") Cloned Vinyl 1998 
 Fried Mix EP (12", EP) Design Music 1999 
 Liquid Brain E.P. (12", EP) Conform, Conform 1999 
 Mounths Mood EP (12") Fine Audio Recordings 1999 
 01 (12") Sketch Music Architecture 2001 
 02 (12") Sketch Music Architecture 2001 
 Appendix B (12") Southsoul Appendix 2001 
 Yukiko EP (12") Sketch Music Architecture 2001 
 03 (12") Sketch Music Architecture 2002 
 04 (12") Sketch Music Architecture 2002 
 Shake Records Ref.01 (12") Shake Records 2002 
 Smack (12") Definition Records 2002 
 05 (12") Sketch Music Architecture 2003 
 Controllin' Pieces (12") SuperBra 2003 
 Plastic Floor (12") Shake Records 2003 
 Southbound EP (12", EP) Analytic Trail 2003 
 Body League (12") Shake Records 2004 
 Childhood Heroes EP (12", EP) Genetic Recordings 2004 
 Hard Angel (12") Audiolove Music 2004 
 Ice On Graz (12") Sketch Music Architecture 2004 
 Massive Storm (12") Orion Muzik 2004 
 4 Ever White (12") MiniSketch 2005 
 Get The Right Shuffle (12") Sketch Music Architecture 2005 
 Ipso Facto Day (12") Sketch Music Architecture 2005 
 Antigravitational / Realistic (12") Sketch Music Architecture 2006 
 Bike On The Rocks / Changing Guards (12") Kombination Research 2006 
 Make Me... (12", Promo, W/Lbl) MiniSketch 2006 
 Minisketch 3 (12") MiniSketch 2006 
 Panik Reinterpretation (12", Cle) Resopal Schallware 2006 
 Almond Eyes EP (12", EP) Ovum Recordings 2007 
 Rosso Pomodoro (12") Cmyk Musik 2007 
 It's All About Toe (12") Adagio 2008
 Westside Story (with Luca Bachetti) (12") Hideout 2009
 Cherry On the Cake (with Andrea Ferlin) (10") M500 2009
 One Lobster, Please (with Michele Tabucchi) (12") SCI + TEC Digital Audio 2009
 Black Cabbage Soup EP (12") Supernature 2009
 What About The Vice (12") Desolat 2009
 Pigwings (with Phutura) (12") Titbit 2010
 Around The Bay (with Luca Bachetti) (12") Hideout 2010
 Tutti Frutti (12") Hideout 2010
 That Ginger Ponytail (with Guti) (12") Hideout 2010
 Crocodile Tears (12") Hideout 2011
 Manifesto (12") This and That 2012
 Wild Things (with Philip Bader) (12") This and That 2012
 The Other Side Of Hustler (with Guti) (12") This and That 2012
 The Love Story Teller (12") Result 2012
 Goiânia (12") Cadenza 2012
 Gualicho (with Marcello Burlon) (12") This and That 2015
 Once Upon a Time In Napoli (2 x LP) Crosstown Rebels 2018

References

Living people
Italian DJs
1977 births
Electronic dance music DJs